Lani Hall (born November 6, 1945) is an American singer, lyricist, and author. From 1966 to 1971 she performed as lead vocalist for Sérgio Mendes & Brasil '66. In 1972 Hall released her first solo album, Sun Down Lady. She may be best known, however, for providing the most recognizable (female) face and (female) vocal signature sound to Sérgio's group during her tenure there, and for her rendition of the theme song to the 1983 James Bond film, Never Say Never Again, with its accompanying video, in which she prominently appears. In 1986 she was awarded her first Grammy for Es Fácil Amar, as "Best Latin Pop Performance."

After that year, Hall largely retired, resurfacing in 1998 with the solo album Brasil Nativo. She has recorded more than 22 albums in three different languages and has released three albums on which she performs alongside her husband, Herb Alpert: Anything Goes, I Feel You and Steppin' Out. Hall received her second Grammy Award in 2013 as the producer for the album Steppin' Out.

Music career

Hall's first public appearance occurred in 1965 at The Centaur, a coffee house in Old Town, Chicago. She was heard by Brazilian pianist and bandleader Sérgio Mendes, who was on tour in Chicago. He first heard her perform at a benefit at Mother Blue's, another club in Old Town. His group, Brasil '65 was disbanding, and he invited Hall to come to Los Angeles to be the lead singer of his new project, Sérgio Mendes & Brasil '66. As she was only 19 and still living with her parents, she agreed only after Mendes met her father and obtained his blessing, and six months later, the group signed a contract with A&M Records.

Unlike the previous incarnation, Brasil '66 was an instant success – making a significant impact on the charts with its first single, a version of the Brazilian song "Mas Que Nada". Much of the song's appeal was due to Hall's distinctive, multi-tracked vocals and Herb Alpert's expertise as producer.

A series of popular interpretations followed, including the group's take on the Beatles' "The Fool on the Hill" and "Day Tripper". 
In 1966 the band was the opening act that toured alongside A&M labelmates (and label founder) Herb Alpert and the Tijuana Brass.

In 1970, midway through the production of the folk-rock concept album Stillness, Hall left Brasil '66 and was replaced by Mendes' wife Gracinha Leporace. Hall embarked on a solo career with Herb Alpert, assuming production duties. She released Sun Down Lady in 1972, followed up by Hello It's Me in 1975. She regularly recorded throughout the 1970s and 1980s, recording the title song for the James Bond film Never Say Never Again in 1983, produced by Mendes and Alpert. Never Say Never Again was the second of only two James Bond films to date not to be produced by EON Productions; coincidentally, Alpert had performed the instrumental theme for the first, 1967's Casino Royale.

Beginning in 1982, Hall recorded several successful Latin pop albums in Spanish, culminating in 1985's Es Fácil Amar, produced by Albert Hammond, for which she received the Grammy Award for Best Latin Pop Performance. Among her Spanish hits were "Un Amor Así" and "De Repente El Amor", duets with José Feliciano and Roberto Carlos, respectively; "Para Vivir Así," which features Herb Alpert on trumpet; and another duet, "Te Quiero Así" with the iconic José José (who also began his career with a bossa nova/jazz band). She recorded "Corazón Encadenado" and won a Grammy with Camilo Sesto in 1984, though she doesn't speak Spanish.

In the mid-1980s, Hall contracted a debilitating case of Epstein–Barr virus and was forced to take a break from performing. She returned in 1998 with the album Brasil Nativo on the Windham Hill label. In 2008, she reunited with Mendes again, performing the song "Dreamer" on his album Encanto, which also featured Herb Alpert on trumpet.

In 2007, she and Alpert assembled a band consisting of pianist/composer Bill Cantos, bassist Hussain Jiffry and drummer/percussionist Michael Shapiro, developing new arrangements for jazz standards and Brazilian songs. From then until the present, they have continued to tour, and have released three CDs, Anything Goes in 2009, I Feel You in 2011 and Steppin' Out in 2013, which won a Grammy Award for both Alpert (artist) and Hall (producer).

Writing
As a young girl, Hall wrote poetry. She began writing short stories in 1982 while on tour in Mexico City. In 2012 she published Emotional Memoirs & Short Stories. Written over the course of more than 30 years, the book contains fiction and nonfiction stories that describe women coping with the vicissitudes of life.

Personal life
In December 1973, Hall married Herb Alpert. Together they have a daughter, actress Aria Alpert.

The Alperts live on a 5.5-acre beachfront compound by the Pacific Coast Highway in West Malibu, which Herb Alpert acquired in the early 1970s. Hall is stepmother to Dore and Eden, children of Herb Alpert's first marriage to Sharon Mae (Lubin).

Discography

Solo albums 
1972 – Sun Down Lady 
1975 – Hello It's Me
1976 – Sweet Bird
1979 – Double or Nothing
1980 – Blush
1981 – A Brazileira (Portuguese)
1982 – Albany Park
1982 – Lani (Spanish)
1984 – Lani Hall (Spanish)
1984 – Collectibles
1985 – Es Fácil Amar (Spanish)
1987 – Classics Volume 19
1987 – Lo Mejor De Lani (Spanish)
1998 – Brasil Nativo
2022 - Seasons of Love (featuring Herb Alpert)

Solo singles 
1976 – "Send in the Clowns"
1980 – "Come What May"
1981 – "Where's Your Angel?" (peaked at No. 88 on the Billboard Hot 100)
1982 – "Te Quiero Así (Duet with Jose Jose) 
1983 – "Never Say Never Again"
1983 – "I Don't Want You to Go"
1984 – "Para Vivir Así"
1985 – "De Repente El Amor" (Duet with Roberto Carlos)
1985 – "Un Amor Así" (Duet with Jose Feliciano)

Collaboration albums

Albums with Sérgio Mendes and Brasil '66
1966 – Herb Alpert Presents Sergio Mendes & Brasil '66
1967 – Equinox
1968 – Look Around
1968 – Fool on the Hill
1969 – Crystal Illusions
1969 – Ye-Me-Lê
1970 – Live at Expo '70
1971 – Stillness

Albums with Herb Alpert
1978 – Herb Alpert / Hugh Masekela
2009 – Anything Goes
2011 – I Feel You
2013 – Steppin' Out

Bibliography

References

External links 

1945 births
Living people
Singers from Chicago
Grammy Award winners
Windham Hill Records artists
Spanish-language singers of the United States
American performers of Latin music
American women pop singers
American women jazz singers
American jazz singers
A&M Records artists
Jazz musicians from Illinois
Sergio Mendes and Brasil '66 members
Women in Latin music
21st-century American women